Kelly Thordsen, born Sherman Jess Thordsen (January 19, 1917 – January 23, 1978) was an American film and television actor.

Life and career 
Thordsen was born in Deadwood, South Dakota. He served in the United States Navy during World War II and the Korean War, and worked as a police officer at the Los Angeles Police Department for twelve years. Thordsen began his screen career in 1956 in the film The Desperados Are in Town. He then played an uncredited role in the 1957 film The True Story of Jesse James. In the same year, Thordsen played the part of Sgt. Bruce in the film Invasion of the Saucer Men.

Thordsen guest-starred in numerous television programs including Gunsmoke, Bonanza, Wagon Train, The Life and Legend of Wyatt Earp, The Deputy, Tales of Wells Fargo, Cheyenne, The Andy Griffith Show, Rawhide, Perry Mason, The Time Tunnel, The Fugitive, The Rockford Files and Cimarron Strip. He played the recurring role of "Colorado Charlie" for five episodes of the action and adventure television series Yancy Derringer. 

Thordsen played Detective Sgt. Hank Johnson in the 1959 film City of Fear, and a sheriff in the 1962 film Sweet Bird of Youth. Thordsen also had an uncredited role as a burly man in To Kill a Mockingbird. Other film appearances included The Ugly Dachshund (1966), and Good Times (1967). 

In 1972 he appeared in two episodes of the television sitcom Sanford and Son. He played Sheriff L. D. Wicker in the 1974 film The Parallax View. His final credit was from the action and adventure television series Switch.

Death 
Thordsen died in January 1978 of cancer at his home in Sun Valley, California, at the age of 61. He was buried in Forest Lawn Memorial Park.

References

External links 

Rotten Tomatoes profile

1917 births
1978 deaths
People from Deadwood, South Dakota
Male actors from South Dakota
Deaths from cancer in California
American male film actors
American male television actors
20th-century American male actors
Burials at Forest Lawn Memorial Park (Hollywood Hills)
United States Army personnel of the Korean War
United States Navy sailors
Los Angeles Police Department officers